Syncopacma dolini is a moth of the family Gelechiidae. It was described by Oleksiy V. Bidzilya in 2005. It is found in Kyrgyzstan.

References

Moths described in 2005
Syncopacma
Insects of Central Asia